Cassandra Lee (born October 15, 2005) is a Canadian artistic gymnast. She represented Canada at the inaugural Junior World Championships and the 2021 World Championships.

Early life 
Lee was born in Toronto in 2005.

Gymnastics career

Junior

2018 
Lee competed at Elite Canada in the novice division; she finished 25th.  She next competed at the Canadian Championships where she finished 16th.

2019 
Lee made her international debut at the International Gymnix challenge cup.  She finished 11th in the all-around.  At the Canadian Championships Lee finished fourth in the all-around but third on uneven bars and floor exercise.  Lee was selected to represent Canada at the inaugural junior World Championships alongside Clara Raposo and Okeri Katjivari.  As a team they finished 12th and individually Lee finished 22nd in the all-around.

2020 
Lee competed at Elite Canada where she finished second in the junior all-around behind Maya Zonneveld. As a result, she was selected to compete at International Gymnix. While there, she was part of the Canadian team that finished fourth. Individually, she finished fourteenth in the all-around.

Senior

2021 
Lee became age-eligible for senior competition in 2021 and made her senior debut at Elite Canada, which was held virtually due to the COVID-19 pandemic in Canada. She finished seventh in the all-around and third on floor exercise.  Lee next competed at two Technical Trials. She next competed at the Canadian Championships where she finished 12th.

Lee competed at the Koper Challenge Cup in September.  She won gold on balance beam and placed fourth on floor exercise.  In October she competed at the World Championships.  She only competed on the balance beam and finished 21st during qualifications; she did not advance to the event final.

2022 
Lee competed at Elite Canada where she finished second in the all-around behind Ellie Black.  Additionally she placed first on balance beam and floor exercise.  She next competed at the 2022 City of Jesolo Trophy where she helped Canada finish third in the team competition.  Individually she qualified to and finished seventh in the floor exercise final.  In July Lee was selected to compete at the Commonwealth Games alongside Laurie Denommée, Jenna Lalonde, Emma Spence, and Maya Zonneveld.  During the team final Lee helped Canada finish third behind England and Australia.  She qualified to the floor exercise final where she finished fifth.

Competitive history

References

External links 
 Cassie Lee at Gymnastics Canada
 

2005 births
Living people
Canadian female artistic gymnasts
Sportspeople from Ontario
21st-century Canadian women
Gymnasts at the 2022 Commonwealth Games
Commonwealth Games bronze medallists for Canada
Commonwealth Games medallists in gymnastics
Medallists at the 2022 Commonwealth Games